Gay exorcisms, similar to demonic exorcisms, are where an exorcist evicts "homosexual demons" or other spiritual entities from an LGBT individual. These exorcisms are intended to "remove" homosexuality from an individual. Reports of these exorcisms still occur in modern times, but are usually kept secret within the church.

Cases
Rev. Dr. Roland Stringfellow, a minister in California, said he had been subjected to anti-gay exorcism himself in the 1990s, which “caused nothing but shame and embarrassment”.

In 2009 a case in Connecticut was recorded on video. A 16-year-old boy was beaten in a church for 20 minutes by a group of church leaders acting as exorcists shouting "sacraments" such as, "Pray out the gay!", and "Foul Queer, be not here!" . The video was later released on YouTube.

See also
 Christianity and homosexuality
 Conversion therapy
 Exorcism
 Ex-gay

References

Exorcism in Christianity
LGBT and Christianity
Sexual orientation change efforts